Parabaphothrips is a genus of thrips in the family Phlaeothripidae, first described by Dudley Moulton in 1949. There is just one species in this genus: Parabaphothrips coffeae found in Africa.

References

Phlaeothripidae
Thrips
Thrips genera